The Guerrilleros de Cristo Rey (English: Warriors of Christ the King) was a Spanish far-right paramilitary organisation that operated in the late 1970s, primarily in the Basque Country and Madrid, but also in Navarre. They emerged at a time of factionism within the Carlist movement. Historically Carlism was a traditionalist, legitimist and Catholic movement, supporting a different monarchial line to the one occupying the Spanish throne. But when the succession fell to Carlos Hugo, he began to support a left-wing, social democrat ideology under the banner of the Carlist Party. This caused large scale conflict within the movement; many proclaimed his more traditionalist minded brother, Sixtus Henry, as Carlist regent. Probably the most notable incident involving the group was the Montejurra massacre of 1976, which happened during the annual Carlist pilgrimage to the Montejurra mountain in Navarre. During this attack, two supporters of the Carlos Hugo faction (Ricardo García Pellejero and Aniano Jiménez Santo) were killed. José Luis Marín García Verde and Hermenegildo García Llorente, alleged members of this armed group, were arrested later, but were later released without investigation as Manuel Fraga (Member of Franco's political board) gave direct instructions not to prosecute these murders. The presence of known European Fascist criminals, active in organisations such as Batallón Vasco Español or Alianza Apostólica Anticomunista and Italy in this has left to some speculating a link to the Cold War-era Operation Gladio.

Attacks
Attacks attributed to the Warriors of Christ the King:
December 1970: Members of the organisation beat various progressive priests in Ondarroa.
2 May 1973: Mariano Sánchez Covisa (leader of the organisation) was arrested for attacking a mass organised by the Movimientos Apostólicos Obreros de Madrid.
9 May 1976: During Montejurra massacre members of the organisation were related to the violent actions that took place, along with other terrorist organisations.
26 September 1976: The group assassinated 21-year-old student Carlos González Martínez, who was attending a protest of tribute to the last persons executed by Francoist dictatorship in Madrid.
23 January 1977: Members of the organisation assassinated 19-year-old Arturo Ruiz (member of the Young Red Guard, the youth wing of the Party of Labour of Spain) in Madrid.
24 August 1978: The group burned the headquarters of the Basque nationalist and anarchist magazine Askatasuna.

Notes

References

Far-right terrorism in Spain
Paramilitary organisations based in Spain
1968 establishments in Spain
Organizations established in 1968
1980 disestablishments in Spain
Organizations disestablished in 1980
Anti-communist terrorism
Christian terrorism in Europe
20th century in Spain
Basque history
Political history of Spain
Spanish nationalism